Angua may refer to:

Angua, a gram panchayat of Dantan I in Kharagpur, Paschim Medinipur, West Bengal, India
Kwane a Ngie, an 18th-century ruler of Cameroon known in British records as "Angua"
Delphine Angua von Uberwald, a fictional character in Terry Pratchett's Ankh-Morpork City Watch